Roqeh may refer to:
Roqeh-ye Kabir
Roqeh-ye Soghirah